Spertus Institute for Jewish Learning and Leadership (Spertus College or Spertus) is a private educational center in Chicago, Illinois. Spertus offers learning opportunities that are "rooted in Jewish wisdom and culture and open to all" although it is not affiliated with any single branch of Judaism.  Graduate programs and workshops "train leaders and engage individuals in exploration of Jewish life."  Public programs include films, speakers, seminars, concerts, and exhibits — at the institute's main campus at 610 S. Michigan Avenue, as well as in the Chicago suburbs and online.

Spertus offers graduate degrees in Jewish Professional Studies, Jewish Studies, and until 2016, Nonprofit Management — accredited by North Central Association of Colleges and Schools — as well as professional workshops and a range of public educational and cultural programs.

Well-known presenters have included Supreme Court Justice Ruth Bader Ginsburg, author Jonathan Safran Foer, architect Moshe Safdie,  hip-hop artist Y-Love, pianist/actor/playwright Hershey Felder,  New York Times columnist Thomas Friedman, Psychologist Dr. Tal Ben-Shahar, and statistician Nate Silver.

Honorary degree recipients from 1949 to 2011 have included Rabbi Mordecai M. Kaplan, former Israeli Ambassador to the United States Abba Eban, Rabbi Abraham Joshua Heschel, author and Nobel Peace Prize Laureate Elie Wiesel, author and Nobel Literature Laureate  Isaac Bashevis Singer, feminist author Betty Friedan, actor Leonard Nimoy, and Hazzan Alberto Mizrahi.

History 

The institute was founded in 1924 as Chicago's College of Jewish Studies.

Architecture of the Spertus Institute building
In November 2007, Spertus Institute opened an award-winning, environmentally sustainable facility at 610 S. Michigan Avenue. Designed by Chicago-based Krueck and Sexton Architects, the building features interconnected interior spaces and an unusual ten-story faceted window wall that provides views of the Chicago skyline, Grant Park, and Lake Michigan. This window wall is built from 726 individual pieces of glass in 556 different shapes. The building also houses a 400-seat theater, space for community events and kosher catering facilities.

Like the surrounding buildings, many constructed in the period of architectural innovation that followed the Great Chicago Fire of 1871, this building is forward-looking in its design and use of materials, while maintaining respect for its setting. Like the bays of its 19th- and 20th-century neighbors, the facets that create the façade's dynamic crystalline form allow light to extend into the narrow building, while expanding the views enjoyed from inside. The geometry of the façade is unique because the surface is constantly tilting in three dimensions, resulting in individual units of glass that are parallelograms rather than rectangles. At the same time, the average size of each of the façade's individual panes of glass is consistent with the standard size of the windows in the buildings up and down Michigan Avenue.

The Spertus building was the first new construction in the Historic Michigan Boulevard District after the area was designated a Chicago Landmark in 2002. The cost of the Spertus project was more than $50 million.

In 2011, Meadville Lombard Theological School, a Unitarian Universalist seminary, relocated from its Hyde Park location to the sixth floor of the Spertus building. Academic and administrative tasks of the school now take place in the Spertus building.

Senior staff and faculty
Dr. Dean P. Bell is the ninth president and chief executive officer of Spertus Institute for Jewish Learning and Leadership. He has a PhD and MA from the University of California, Berkeley, and a BA from the University of Chicago, and is the author of Jews in the Early Modern World.
Dr. Hal M. Lewis is chancellor, a position he took in 2018 after serving for a decade as president and chief executive officer.  An expert in Jewish leadership, he is the author of From Sanctuary to Boardroom: A Jewish Approach to Leadership  and Models and Meanings in the History of Jewish Leadership. Dr. Lewis has a DJS from Spertus.
Dr. Keren E. Fraiman is dean and chief academic officer.
Ellen Hattenbach is the vice president of external relations. She is the former chair of the Jewish United Fund Division for Trades, Industries & Professions, and a graduate of Spertus Institute's Certificate in Jewish Leadership.

Notable former faculty
Rabbi Dr. Byron Sherwin (1946–2015) was director of doctoral programs. A native of New York, Dr. Sherwin received his PhD from the University of Chicago’s prestigious Committee on the History of Culture. He received his Rabbinical Ordination from Jewish Theological Seminary of America (JTSA) where he was a protégé of Abraham Joshua Heschel. He authored many books including Golems Among Us: How a Jewish Legend Can Help Us Navigate the Biotech Century, Jewish Ethics for the 21st Century, and Sparks Amidst the Ashes: The Spiritual Legacy of Polish Jewry.

See also
 List of Jewish universities and colleges in the United States
 Hebrew Theological College:  Jewish seminary in Skokie
 Illinois Holocaust Museum and Education Center:  Museum in Skokie
 History of the Jews in Chicago

References

External links

Official website

Universities and colleges in Chicago
Museums in Chicago
Jewish universities and colleges
Jewish universities and colleges in the United States
Jews and Judaism in Chicago
Jewish museums in Illinois
Jewish studies research institutes
University museums in Illinois
Educational institutions established in 1924
Graduate schools in the United States
1924 establishments in Illinois
Private universities and colleges in Illinois
Cultural centers in Chicago